Maug  (from the Chamorro name for the islands, Ma'ok, meaning "steadfast" or "everlasting") consists of a group of three small uninhabited islands. This island group is part of the Northern Islands Municipality of the Commonwealth of the Northern Mariana Islands, itself part of the Marianas archipelago in the Oceanian sub-region of Micronesia.

Geography

Environment
The islands are overgrown with savannah grass. On East Island are  Pandanus  trees  and coconut palms (Cocos nucifera), near the former settlement.

Important Bird Area
The islands have been recognised as an Important Bird Area (IBA) by BirdLife International because they support populations of Micronesian megapodes, red-tailed tropicbirds, brown noddies, Micronesian myzomelas and Micronesian starlings.

History 
From a European perspective, the Maug Islands were discovered on 22 August 1522 by Gonzalo Gómez de Espinosa, who named it Las Monjas (The Nuns in Spanish). Gómez de Espinosa was a member of Ferdinand Magellan‘s attempted circumnavigation of the globe, and after Magellan’s death unsuccessfully attempted to navigate the ship Trinidad across the Pacific Ocean to Mexico. Gomez de Espinosa found the largest island of the Maug Islands settled by Chamorros, who called the island Mao or Pamo. Gómez de Espinosa freed the Chamorro whom he had kidnapped on Agrihan and three of his crewmen deserted the Trinidad on the island. Two of the deserters were killed by the Chamorros, but the third, Gonzalo Alvarez de Vigo, later came to Guam. In 1669, the Spanish missionary Diego Luis de San Vitores visited the Maug Islands and named it San Lorenzo (St. Lawrence). In 1695, all of the inhabitants were forcibly deported to Saipan, and three years later, to Guam. Since that time, the islands have been uninhabited.

Maug Islands were ceded by Spain to Germany through the German–Spanish Treaty (1899), together with the rest of the Mariana Islands (except Guam). The formalities of cession were carried on November 17, 1899, in Saipan, for all the Northern Mariana Islands.

Following the sale of the Northern Marianas by Spain to the German Empire in 1899, the Maug islands were administered as part of German New Guinea. In 1903, the island was leased to a Japanese company, who hunted birds for feathers for export to Japan, and from there to Paris.

During World War I, the Maug Islands came under the control of the Empire of Japan and were subsequently administered as part of the South Seas Mandate. The Japanese established a weather station on the islands, and a fish processing plant. The island became part of the vast US US Naval Base Marianas. During World War II, the German auxiliary cruiser Orion rendezvoused with supply ships in January–February 1941 at the caldera of the Maug Islands.

Following World War II, the island came under the control of the United States and was administered as part of the Trust Territory of the Pacific Islands. Since 1978, the island has been part of the Northern Islands Municipality of the Commonwealth of the Northern Mariana Islands.

In 1985, per the Constitution of the Commonwealth of the Northern Mariana Islands, the islands were designated as a wilderness area for the protection and conservation of natural resources. Since 2009, the submerged lands and waters around the island have been part of Marianas Trench Marine National Monument of the United States.

Gallery

See also
 List of stratovolcanoes

References

External links 

 Pascal Horst Lehne and Christoph Gäbler: Über die Marianen. Lehne-Verlag, Wohldorf in Germany 1972.

Former German colonies
Uninhabited islands of the Northern Mariana Islands
Stratovolcanoes of the United States
Volcanoes of the Northern Mariana Islands
Islands of the Northern Mariana Islands
Archipelagoes of the Pacific Ocean
Calderas of Oceania
Important Bird Areas of the Northern Mariana Islands
Seabird colonies